Monticello Township is a township in Piatt County, Illinois, USA.  As of the 2010 census, its population was 5,906 and it contained 2,651 housing units.

Geography
Monticello is Township 18 North, Range 6 East and part of Township 18 North, Range 5 East of the Third Principal Meridian.

The streams of Camp Creek and Goose Creek are tributaries of the Sangamon River which runs through this township.

Cities and towns
 Monticello (large majority)

Adjacent townships
 Sangamon Township (north)
 Scott Township, Champaign County (northeast)
 Colfax Township, Champaign County (east)
 Sadorus Township, Champaign County (southeast)
 Bement Township (south)
 Willow Branch Township (west)
 Goose Creek Township (northwest)

Cemeteries
The township contains several cemeteries: Haneline (Section 14, T. 18 N., R. 5 E.), Monticello, Monticello and Woolington.
Barnes Cemetery is in Section 1, T. 18 N., R. 6 E.

Schools
Haneline School No. 69 (Section 23, T. 18 N., R. 5 E.), a brick building, is now a residence on Allerton Road.

Major highways
  Interstate 72
  Illinois State Route 105

Airports and landing strips
 Piatt County Airport

Demographics

References
 U.S. Board on Geographic Names (GNIS)
 United States Census Bureau cartographic boundary files

External links

 US-Counties.com
 City-Data.com
 Illinois State Archives

Townships in Piatt County, Illinois
1859 establishments in Illinois
Populated places established in 1859
Townships in Illinois